Muttharasanallur is a village in Tiruchirapalli in the state of Tamil Nadu, India.  It is located approximately 7 km to the west of Trichy City on the road to the town of Karur (the route is well served by a number of bus lines).  Mutharasanallur is a main agricultural village with water source from the River Kaveri.

Culture 
Muttharasanallur people are living as family.  People are having relationships with each other and they are taking care of each other.  The main businesses are agriculture.  After doing their job in agriculture, they spend their time in local celebrations for their traditional God.

Economy 
The village has 90% agricultural land.  The major income from agriculture comes from cultivating rice, cucumber, bananas, sugarcane, Blackgram and Sesame.

Temples
 Sri Sithi vinayakar temple
 Sri Sakthi mariyamman temple (150+ years)
 Sri Madurakaliyamman temple (200+ years)
 Shiva Temple (300+ Years old)
 Sri Lakshmi Narayanar Temple (300+ Years Old)
 Adaikalam Kaatha Amman
 Mosque
Shri Maha Maariyamman temple (Kaikudi) (200+ years)

Transport 
Well connected Government Buses, Mini buses from Trichy Chatram Bus Stand, and Railway facilities are available connecting from Trichy Junction and Trichy Fort.

Government Facilities 

 Mutharasanallur Railway Station
 Post Office
 Telephone Exchange
 High School
 Veterinary Hospital
 Bank

Administration 
This village is a Village Panchayat under Andanallur Union.  The village belongs to Srirangam Taluk of Tiruchirapalli district and the below areas are under Mutharasanallur Panchayat administration.

List of streets (alphabetical order)
 Agraharam
 Amman Nagar
 Anna Nagar
 Cauvery Nagar
 DEVANGA NAGAR
 Green Park Nagar
 Gudalur
 Kaikudi
 Kamaraja Puram
 Kavalkara Street
 Mandapa Thoppu
 Murungapettai
 Muthamizhl Puram
 Ramnagar
 Sekkillar Kudil
 Sri Ganapathi Nagar
 Vasanth Nagar
 Vellalar Street
 Tamilzhan Nagar

President
 (Current President details to be updated)

Ex-President
 Lalitha Kamaraj B.com - (Since 2006- 2016)
 N. Kamaraj B.com-(Since 1996-2006)
 S.Rajasekar B.A ( 1984 - 1989 )
 K.Ganesan 1964

External links
 Mutharasanallur Blog
 Mutharasanallur Group
 Mutharasanallur Tamil Version

Villages in Tiruchirappalli district